Mukono Town is a municipality in Mukono District in the Central Region of  Uganda. The town is administered by the Mukono Town Council. The district headquarters are located in this town.

Location
Mukono Municipality is 21 km east of Kampala along the Kampala-Jinja Highway. It is bordered by Kalagi to the north, Kira Town to the west, Lake Victoria to the south, and Lugazi to the east.

The coordinates of the town of Mukono are 00 21 36N, 32 45 00E (Latitude:0.3600; Longitude:32.7500).

Demographics
Mukono is one of Uganda's fastest growing urban areas. The 2002 national census estimated the population of the town at 46,506. In 2010, the Uganda Bureau of Statistics (UBOS) estimated the population at 57,400. In 2011, UBOS estimated the mid-year population at 59,000. On 27 August 2014, the national population census put the population at 162,710.

Organizational structure
Mukono Municipality administration is divided into (a) the political arm headed by the Mayor, (b) the technical arm headed by the Town Clerk and the legislative arm, headed by the Speaker of the town council. The council is the supreme policy-making organ in the town. It is composed of 26 elected councilors. Members of the town council serve four-year terms.
The mayor of the town is elected to a five-year term by universal adult suffrage using a secret ballot. The technical staff of the town council are headed by the town clerk under whom there are four municipal departments: the Management Department, the Treasury Department, the Public Health Department, and the Engineering Department.

Points of interest
The following additional points of interest are located within the town limits or close to its edges:

1. Mukono Central Market

2. Uganda Christian University, a private university affiliated to the Church of Uganda

3.

4. Kampala-Jinja Highway, passing through the center of town in a general west to east direction

5. Mukono Health Centre IV

6. Various supermarkets located among the Kampala-Jinja highway, most notably City Shoppers, Sombe Supermarket and Paris Corner Supermarket.

7. Greater Mukono Tourism and Conservation Centre

8. Abacus Parenteral Drugs Limited, a pharmaceutical company that manufactures intravenous fluids and sterile water for use in injections, ear drops, and eye drops.

See also

 List of cities and towns in Uganda
 Namilyango College

References

External links
Official Website

Populated places in Central Region, Uganda
Cities in the Great Rift Valley
Mukono District